Meng Xiangfeng (born 17 December 1964) is a Chinese politician who is the current executive deputy director of the General Office of the Chinese Communist Party, in office since October 2020.

He is a representative of the 19th and 20th National Congress of the Chinese Communist Party and a member of the 19th and 20th Central Committee of the Chinese Communist Party.

Biography
Meng was born in Pingxiang County, Henan, on 17 December 1964. 

He entered the workforce in August 1986, and joined the Chinese Communist Party (CCP) in January 1986. He worked in the Central Commission for Discipline Inspection (CCDI) for a long time. He was promoted to be deputy secretary of Liaoning Provincial Commission for Discipline Inspection in May 2008, concurrently serving as head of the Liaoning Provincial Supervision Department since November 2011. 
In March 2013, he was appointed director of the National Administration for the Protection of State Secrets and director of the Research Office of General Office of the Chinese Communist Party, but having held the position for only two years. In October 2020, he took office as executive deputy director of the General Office of the Chinese Communist Party.

References

1964 births
Living people
People from Xingtai
Jilin University alumni
Central Party School of the Chinese Communist Party alumni
People's Republic of China politicians from Henan
Chinese Communist Party politicians from Henan
Members of the 19th Central Committee of the Chinese Communist Party